Elaine Hudson is an Australian actress and director. For her performance in Joh's Jury she was nominated for the 1993 AFI Award For Best Actress in a Leading Role in a Television Drama. Other screen roles include playing Lindy Chamberlain in The Disappearance of Azaria Chamberlain. Her lengthy stage career includes directing and playing the title character The Lady From Dubuque (Belvoir Street Theatre, 1996) and playing the lead in Burnt Piano (Belvoir Street Theatre, 1999).

References

External links
 

 
Living people
Australian film actresses
Australian television actresses
Australian stage actresses